Sarayan County is in South Khorasan province, Iran. The capital of the county is the city of Sarayan. At the 2006 census, the county's population was 34,636 in 9,140 households. The following census in 2011 counted 32,493 people in 9,466 households. At the 2016 census, the county's population was 33,312 in 10,329 households. Sarayan is in the north central part of the province. The county was a part of Ferdows County until May 2004.

Administrative divisions

The population history of Sarayan County's administrative divisions over three consecutive censuses is shown in the following table. The latest census shows two districts, four rural districts, and three cities.

References

 

Counties of South Khorasan Province